is a Japanese football player.

Playing career
Takachi was born in Kawaguchi on April 23, 1980. After graduating from high school, through some Brazilian club, he joined J1 League club Tokyo Verdy in 2001. However he could not play at all in the match. In the middle of 2001, he moved to Prefectural Leagues club Okinawa Kariyushi FC. The club was promoted to Regional Leagues from 2002. In 2003, he moved to Prefectural Leagues club FC Ryukyu. In 2005, he moved to J2 League club Sagan Tosu. He became a regular player and played many matches as left side back from 2005. In 2007, he played many matches as defensive midfielder. Although he returned to left side back in 2008, he played many matches as defensive midfielder in 2009. In 2010, he moved to J2 club Yokohama FC. He became a regular player and played many matches as many defensive position. In 2014, he moved to J2 club FC Gifu. He played many matches until 2015. However his opportunity to play decreased in 2016. In 2017, he moved to Regional Leagues club Tegevajaro Miyazaki. In 2018, he moved to Regional Leagues club Tochigi Uva FC (later Tochigi City FC).

Club statistics
.

References

External links

1980 births
Living people
Association football people from Saitama Prefecture
Japanese footballers
J1 League players
J2 League players
Tokyo Verdy players
FC Ryukyu players
Sagan Tosu players
Yokohama FC players
FC Gifu players
Tegevajaro Miyazaki players
Tochigi City FC players
Association football midfielders